Clarisa Crowell is an American former softball player and current head coach at Penn State. She previously served as the head coach at Miami.

Playing career
Crowell played college softball for Virginia Tech from 1999 to 2002. As a freshman, she posted a 25–8 record with a 1.05 earned run average (ERA), 209 strikeouts and three no-hitters, and was named to the Atlantic 10 All-Conference Team. As a sophomore, she posted a 20–8 record, with a 1.48 ERA, and hit .296 with nine home runs. Following the season she was named to the Virginia all-state team as a pitcher and an outfielder, becoming the first player in state history to make the team at two different positions in the same year. She finished her career with a 65–25 record, with a 1.39 ERA and 475 strikeouts. She also batted .289 for her career, with 16 home runs and 35 doubles.

She finished her career ranked first in winning percentage (.722) and second in career ERA (1.36), strikeouts (362), wins (65), starts (87), innings pitched (614), appearances (106), complete games (62), and shutouts (26). She ranked fourth on the Hokies' career games played list (243) and finished her career with 200 hits, 293 total bases, and 104 runs scored. On November 7, 2013, she was inducted into the Virginia Tech Sports Hall of Fame, becoming the second softball player inducted into the Hall of Fame following Michelle Meadows in 2010.

Coaching career
Croswell began her coaching career as a volunteer assistant coach at her alma mater Virginia Tech from September 2002 to May 2003. She then served as an assistant coach at Ohio from 2004 to 2005, where she was responsible for mentoring the Bobcats' pitchers and infielders, while also assisting with hitting instruction. She served as an assistant coach at Syracuse for one year in 2006, where she assisted the pitching staff. She then served as an assistant coach at Oklahoma State for six years from 2007 to 2012, where she primarily worked with the pitching staff.

Miami
On August 15, 2012, Croswell was named the head coach of the Miami RedHawks softball team. In 2019, she led Miami to a 35–16 overall record and a 16–4 record in conference play as the RedHawks won their first regular-season title in program history. In eight years as head coach of Miami, she posted a career record of 209–182, becoming the winningest coach in program history.

Penn State
On August 3, 2020, Croswell was named the head coach of the Penn State Nittany Lions softball team.

Head coaching record

References

Living people
American softball coaches
Miami RedHawks softball coaches
Ohio Bobcats softball coaches
Oklahoma State Cowgirls softball coaches
Penn State Nittany Lions softball coaches
Syracuse Orange softball coaches
Virginia Tech Hokies softball players
Virginia Tech Hokies softball coaches
Year of birth missing (living people)